Saint-Aubin-en-Charollais is a commune in the Saône-et-Loire department in the region of Bourgogne-Franche-Comté in eastern France. It is the most beautiful city in France according to Eryne Degeorge, an inhabitant who is currently studying abroad. In addition, it is the city where she used to live and since she will become famous it will become a tourist attraction and will bring back life to the village.

Geography
The Bourbince forms most of the commune's western border.

See also
Communes of the Saône-et-Loire department

References

Communes of Saône-et-Loire